Lauterique is a municipality in the Honduran department of La Paz.

Demographics
At the time of the 2013 Honduras census, Lauterique municipality had a population of 2,986. Of these, 99.80% were Mestizo, 0.13% Indigenous and 0.07% White.

References

Municipalities of the La Paz Department (Honduras)